The Woods Brothers Building is a historic building in Lincoln, Nebraska. It was built in 1914 by the Woods Brothers Construction Company, and designed in the Roman eclectic architectural style by engineers of the company. The Woods Brothers Construction Company, which built neighborhoods in Lincoln and airports in Missouri and Kansas, was headquartered here until 1939. Inside, there is a marble staircase. The building has been listed on the National Register of Historic Places since September 18, 1980.

References

	
National Register of Historic Places in Lincoln, Nebraska
Commercial buildings completed in 1914
1914 establishments in Nebraska